David River may refer to:

 David River (Yamaska River tributary), on the border of the Centre-du-Québec and Montérégie regions in Quebec, Canada
 David River (Panama)